"U Understand" is song by American hip hop artist Juvenile. It was released in November 1999 as the lead single from his 1999 album Tha G-Code.

Track listing
"U Understand (Radio)"	
"U Understand (Extra Clean)"	
"U Understand (Instrumental)"	
"U Understand (Dirty)"

Charts

References

1999 singles
Cash Money Records singles
Juvenile (rapper) songs
Mannie Fresh songs
Dirty rap songs
1999 songs
Song recordings produced by Mannie Fresh
Song articles with missing songwriters
Songs written by Mannie Fresh
Songs written by Juvenile (rapper)